Ruth Hall may refer to:

Ruth Hall (novel), an 1854 roman à clef by Fanny Fern (pen name of Sara Payson Willis)
Ruth Hall (actress) (1910–2003), American actress
Ruth Hall (academic) (born 1973), South African political scientist
Ruth Hall (activist), British campaigner against rape
Ruth Hall (scientist) (born 1945), Australian microbiologist

Hall, Ruth